Second Place is a 2021 novel by Rachel Cusk.

Premise 
A female narrator, M, invites a famous painter, L, to use her guesthouse on the English coast marshlands where she lives with her family. It is inspired by Mabel Dodge Luhan's 1932 memoir Lorenzo in Taos, about the writer D. H. Lawrence's early 1920s sojourn in Taos, New Mexico.

Reception 
Second Place received favourable reviews, with a cumulative "Positive" rating at the review aggregator website Book Marks, based on 40 book reviews from mainstream literary critics. In its starred review, Kirkus Reviews wrote that Cusk's "brilliant prose and piercing insights convey a dark but compelling view of human nature." Publishers Weekly, in its starred review, wrote, "There is the erudition of the author's Outline trilogy here, but with a tightly contained dramatic narrative."

The novel was longlisted for the 2021 Booker Prize, and shortlisted for the Governor General's Award for English-language fiction at the 2021 Governor General's Awards. Blandine Longre's French translation was awarded the 2022 Prix Femina étranger.

References 

2021 British novels
Novels by Rachel Cusk
First-person narrative novels
Novels set in England
Farrar, Straus and Giroux books
Faber and Faber books